KWOL-FM (105.1 FM, "Kool 105.1") is a commercial radio station in Whitefish, Montana, broadcasting to the Kalispell-Flathead Valley, Montana, area. KWOL airs a classic hits music format.

It is owned by Rose Communications, and operated by Bee Broadcasting, Inc. All Bee Broadcasting stations are based at 2431 Highway 2 East, Kalispell.

External links
KWOL official website

WOL
Classic hits radio stations in the United States
Radio stations established in 2005